Lillian Young (March 25, 1928 – January 4, 1983) was an American sprinter. She competed in the women's 100 metres at the 1948 Summer Olympics.

References

External links
 

1928 births
1983 deaths
Athletes (track and field) at the 1948 Summer Olympics
American female sprinters
American female long jumpers
Olympic track and field athletes of the United States
Track and field athletes from Chicago
20th-century American women